"I Can't Stand It" is a song performed by English rock band Blossoms. The song was released as a single in the United Kingdom on 1 March 2018 by Virgin EMI Records as the lead single from their second studio album Cool Like You. The song has peaked at number 77 on the UK Singles Chart and number 60 on the Scottish Singles Chart.

Background
Speaking to Radio X, Tom Ogden said: "We've got a new single out today, so the all-round vibe with the band is good. We're excited about that." Speaking to NME, Ogden said, "In the end, we recorded it in 21 days or something like that, but over the course of maybe 4 months. We looked back at how can we improve ourselves, before we realised that we’ve gotta take our live setup up another level and have some more upbeat songs."

Music video
A music video to accompany the release of "I Can't Stand It" was first released onto YouTube on 9 March 2018. When talking about the video, Tom Ogden said, "The video was inspired by the film Eternal Sunshine of The Spotless Mind. I’m undergoing a procedure to erase memories of a former love."

Track listing

Charts

Release history

References

2018 songs
2018 singles
Virgin EMI Records singles
Blossoms (band) songs